Ranomafana Est is a village and commune in the district of Brickaville Vohibinany (district), Atsinanana Region, Madagascar.
The RN 2 passes through the town.

References

Cities in Madagascar
Populated places in Atsinanana